Squalius valentinus, commonly known as the Valencia chub and the Levantine bagra, is a species of freshwater fish in the carp family Cyprinidae. It was first isolated from the Turia River in Valencia, hence its name. It is considered endangered. This species is differentiated from its cogeneratesa by having eight branched rays in its dorsal fin; eight branched rays in its anal fin; two rows of pharyngeal teeth on both sides possessing 2 and 5 teeth; a wide caudal peduncle; its number of gill rakers; the number of
scales in its lateral line; the number of scale rows above the latter; by possessing three scale rows below it; by having thirty-nine vertebrae (twenty-two of them abdominal and seventeen of them caudal); showing large 4th and 5th infraorbital bones; a maxilla with a very distinct marked anterior process; exhibiting a frontal bone expanded at the middle; a wide neurocranium bone; the lower branch of the pharyngeal bone being robust; a large and narrow urohyal; as well as genetic differences (allozymes).

Description
Its preorbital distance is similar to its eye's diameter, exhibiting a long interorbital distance. Its ventral fin is inserted at the origin of the dorsal fin, on its same axis. Its predorsal length is somewhat larger than its preventral length. It possesses a high caudal peduncle. It shows a large fin size, with a pectoral fin that is larger than the height of its dorsal fin.

Pigmentation
Its body is silver, somewhat darker dorsally; its scales have a big black spot at their base and several small black spots on its distal border. Its peritoneum also carries small black spots. Its scales are deciduous in juveniles.

Osteology
It possesses a wide and short supraethmoid, parietal and frontal bones. The posterior process of its pterotic bone is wide and robust, while the pharyngeal bone's lower branch is very robust. Its urohyal bone is large and thin. The maxilla's anterior process is pointed, and its 4th and 5th infraorbital bones are very wide. The posterior lamina of its cleithrum is widened. It shows a short maxilla with a relatively developed coronoid process. Itd 3rd, 4th and 5th pharyngeal teeth in its external row are small or even lack a masticatory area.

Distribution and habitat
Squalius valentinus inhabits rivers in the Spanish Mediterranean, between the Mijares and Vinalopó basins. The Júcar basin is inhabited by both this species and S. pyrnaicus, although both species are allopatry, the latter inhabiting the upper basin while former is distributed throughout rivers of the lower basin. The species usually is found to inhabit streams with clear waters and gravel bottoms. In streams such as the Gorgos River it is the only endemic fish. In the Turia and Mijares basins it occurs in sympatry with other native cyprinids: Barbus guiraonis, Chondrostoma turiense and Chondrostoma arcasii. S. valentinus inhabits the Júcar, Serpis and Vinalopó basins along with B. guiraonis.

Status
It is a rare species and has a restricted distribution range. The population is currently declining. S. valentinus is frequently dominant as a species in small rivers, however in wide rivers the species is local and rare.

References

Further reading
Doadrio Villarejo, Ignacio, Silvia Perea, and F. Alonso. "A new species of the genus Squalius Bonaparte, 1837 (Actinopterygii, Cyprinidae) from the Tagus River basin (central Spain)." Graellsia 63.1 (2007): 89-100.
Aparicio, Enric, et al. "Development and evaluation of a fish‐based index to assess biological integrity of Mediterranean streams." Aquatic Conservation: Marine and Freshwater Ecosystems 21.4 (2011): 324-337.
Olaya-Marín, Esther Julia, et al. "Modelling native fish richness to evaluate the effects of hydromorphological changes and river restoration (Júcar River Basin, Spain)." Science of the total Environment 440 (2012): 95-105.
Mouton, A. M., et al. "Data-driven fuzzy habitat suitability models for brown trout in Spanish Mediterranean rivers." Environmental Modelling & Software26.5 (2011): 615-622.
Alcaraz, Carles, et al. "Assessing population status of Parachondrostoma arrigonis (Steindachner, 1866), threats and conservation perspectives."Environmental Biology of Fishes 98.1 (2015): 443-455.

External links

FishBase

Squalius
Fauna of Spain
Freshwater fish of Europe
Taxa named by Ignacio Doadrio Villarejo
Taxa named by José Ambrosio González-Carmona
Fish described in 2006